Steven Nicholas Melnyk (born February 26, 1947) is a former American professional golfer and golf sportscaster best known for his success as an amateur golfer.  Melnyk won both the U.S. Amateur and British Amateur.

Early years 

Melnyk was born in Brunswick, Georgia.  He attended the Glynn Academy in Brunswick for his high school education.  Melnyk won the Georgia Open as an 18-year-old amateur golfer in 1965.

Amateur career 

Melnyk attended the University of Florida in Gainesville, Florida, where he played for coach Buster Bishop's Florida Gators men's golf team in National Collegiate Athletic Association (NCAA) competition from 1967 to 1969.  He was a two-time All-American at Florida, and was the number one golfer on the 1968 team that won their first NCAA Division I Golf Championship.  Melnyk graduated from the University of Florida with a bachelor's degree in industrial management in 1969.

Melnyk won the 1969 U.S. Amateur at Oakmont Country Club, shooting a 2-over-par 286 to beat Vinny Giles by five shots at stroke play.  He claimed the British Amateur with a 3 & 2 victory over fellow American Jim Simons at Carnoustie Golf Links in 1971.  Melnyk also had wins at the Western Amateur and Eastern Amateur and played on the 1969 and 1971 Walker Cup teams.  He won the 1965 Georgia Open as an amateur.  He was low amateur in the 1970 British Open (tie for 41st) and at the 1971 Masters Tournament (tie for 24th).

Professional career 

Melnyk turned professional in 1971 after his British Amateur win and started playing on the PGA Tour. He did not find the success he had as an amateur carried over to his professional career. He never won a tournament on the PGA Tour but he did place second four times: the 1973 Phoenix Open, 1974 Houston Open, 1979 First NBC New Orleans Open and 1981 Pensacola Open.  His best finish in a major was a tie for 12th at the 1972 Masters Tournament. He did win the 1972 Masters Par 3 Contest.

At the 1982 Phoenix Open, Melnyk slipped and broke his right elbow.  While recuperating from the injury, he became an on-course reporter for CBS Sports. He resumed playing later that year and both played and reported through the 1984 season when he retired from playing. He stayed with CBS until 1992, when joined ABC Sports. He retired from television in 2004, after 22 years as a reporter and analyst for CBS Sports, ABC Sports and ESPN. He has also designed or co-designed several golf courses.

Melnyk was inducted into the University of Florida Athletic Hall of Fame as a "Gator Great" in 1970, the Georgia Golf Hall of Fame in 1992, and the Florida Sports Hall of Fame in 2000.

Personal life

Melnyk is retired from professional golf and broadcasting but has regained his amateur golfer status and continues to play. He remains actively involved as a University of Florida alumnus and serving a ten-year stint on the board of directors of the Gators athletic boosters, including a term as its president.  He lives in Jacksonville, Florida.

Tournament wins 
1965 Georgia Open (as an amateur)
1969 U.S. Amateur, Western Amateur
1970 Eastern Amateur
1971 British Amateur

Results in major championships

LA = Low amateur
CUT = missed the half-way cut
"T" indicates a tie for a place

U.S. national team appearances
Amateur
Walker Cup: 1969 (winners), 1971

See also 

1971 PGA Tour Qualifying School graduates
List of Florida Gators men's golfers on the PGA Tour
List of University of Florida alumni
List of University of Florida Athletic Hall of Fame members

References

External links 

American male golfers
Florida Gators men's golfers
PGA Tour golfers
Golf writers and broadcasters
Golf course architects
Golfers from Georgia (U.S. state)
Golfers from Jacksonville, Florida
American people of Ukrainian descent
People from Brunswick, Georgia
1947 births
Living people